Promodra nigrata is a species of moth in the family Tortricidae. The species was described by Razowski in 2008. It is found in South Africa.

References

Endemic moths of South Africa
Olethreutini
Moths described in 2008